State Route 253 (SR 253) is a  route that serves as a connection between US 43/SR 118/SR 171 in Winfield with SR 172 in Hackleburg.

Route description
The northern terminus of SR 253 is located at its intersection with SR 172 in downtown Hackleburg. From this point, the route travels in a southerly direction before turning to the east towards Brinn. From Brinn, the route resumes in a southwesterly direction before turning to the south in Twin. It continues winding in this direction until reaching its southern terminus at US 43/SR 118/SR 171 in Winfield.

Major intersections

References

253
Transportation in Marion County, Alabama